The 2009 Alessandria Challenger (known as 2009 Trofeo Cassa di Risparmio di Alessandria) was a professional tennis tournament played on outdoor red clay courts. It was part of the 2009 ATP Challenger Tour. It took place in Alessandria, Italy between May 25–31, 2009.

Singles entrants

Seeds

Rankings are as of May 18, 2009.

Other entrants
The following players received wildcards into the singles main draw:
  Laurynas Grigelis
  Jacopo Marchegiani
  Rubén Ramírez Hidalgo
  Simone Vagnozzi

The following players received entry from the qualifying draw:
 Francesco Aldi
 Juan Sebastián Cabal
 Tatsuma Ito
 José Antonio Sánchez de Luna

Champions

Men's singles

 Blaž Kavčič def.  Jesse Levine, 7–5, 6–3

Men's doubles

 Rubén Ramírez Hidalgo /  José Antonio Sánchez de Luna def.  Martín Alund /  Guillermo Hormazábal, 6–4, 6–2

References
Official website
ITF search 
2009 Draws

Alessandria Challenger
Alessandria Challenger